This is a list of the European Music & Media magazine's European Hot 100 Singles and European Top 100 Albums number-ones of 1990.

1990 record charts
Lists of number-one albums in Europe
Lists of number-one songs in Europe